Alain Lefebvre (born in 1960) is a French entrepreneur and author. He is recognized as a French pioneer in the client server computing and Internet era. He co-founded SQLI in 1990, with a successful IPO in the summer of 2000 during the Internet bubble burst. He led the company for over ten years, and also was recognized for his columns and essays on the computing market in France during this 15-year period. Alain Lefebvre has published more than 29 books, five of which were on computer and Internet topics. Since 1995, Lefebvre and his wife, Murielle Lefebvre have been promoting Montessori education and business in France. Alain Lefebvre is the founder of the first professional social network in France, 6nergies.net. As the precursor and visionary in France of the web 2.0 movement, he spoke at network events, conferences, and was interviewed in 2004. He also published a book about social networks in 2005.

Career
Alain began his career in IT in 1977. In 1980, he was hired by Thomson-CSF to work as a programmer on civil aircraft simulators. He began to specialize as a consultant on DB2 in 1988.

In 1990, he participated in the creation of SQL Engineering, positioned on the niche of client-server applications, which later became SQLI. In 1993, he wrote columns in the weekly Le Monde Informatique IT and 01 Informatique and published his first book: The Client-Server Architecture.

SQLI 
In 1990, Jean Rouveyrolles and Alain Lefebvre founded the company SQLI. In 1995, he directed the technical strategy of SQLI Group Intranet. This involved the introduction of the company to the new market of Euronext Paris in July 2000, SQLI then having 700 employees. This IPO was successful during the early crash of the bubble Internet. This was one of the few company "Internet" to have succeeded/survived the burst of the Internet bubble.

In 1997, Alain Lefebvre began writing essays and a column named "The Terrible Truth" on his personal website. In April 2001, he left the SQLI group and returns to his childhood dream of becoming a motorsport driver, and wrote "Racing" in 2004.

Website
In the summer of 2004, Alain Lefebvre launched the first French social network for professionals: 6nergies.net. Alain Lefebvre published a book on this global movement in 2005: Social Networks, M21 Editions. To promote 6nergies.net, Alain had the idea of making networking evenings for professionals in major French cities – as a precursor of these events they were very successful. Although with more than 20,000 members in 2007, despite its microblogging services and its Skype and Facebook pages, 6nergies.net never took off and didn't manage to raise the sufficient money needed to continue. 6nergies.com disappeared in August 2009.

Books
 Architecture client-serveur, Armand Colin, 1993,  (récompensé par le "Prix du meilleur livre informatique")
 Intranet client-serveur universel, Eyrolles, 1996, 
 Web client-serveur, Eyrolles, 1998, 
 Le Troisième Tournant, Dunod, 2001, .
 Perdu dans le temps, Manuscrit puis M21 éditions, 2004, .
 Les Réseaux sociaux, M21 éditions, 2005, .
 Racing, BOD, 2008, .
 SimRacing, Pearson, 2009, .
 Soheil Ayari, un pilote moderne, écrit avec Sassan Ayari, 2009, .
 Cow-boys contre chemins de fer ou que savez-vous vraiment de l'histoire de l'informatique, écrit avec Laurent Poulain, 2010, .
 Publier sur iPad & Kindle – Réalisez votre ebook: démarche et outils, étape par étape, 2011, .
 Cette révolte qui ne viendra pas, 2011, .
 Prévision Maîtrise Contrôle, Tome 1, 2011, .
 Simracing, seconde édition, 2012, .
 Hacking, 2012, .
 La malédiction des champions du monde de F1, 2012, .
 Looking for TransContinum: Vincent Tria is lost in time, 2012, .
 Un auteur à succès, 2013, .
 Le miroir brisé des réseaux sociaux, 2013, .
 Freedom Machine : la moto rend jeune !, 2014, 
 Prévision Maîtrise Contrôle, tome 2, 
 Prévision Maîtrise Contrôle, tome 3, 2016, 
 La guerre des Froes, 2015, 
 Dr Miracle, saison 1970, 2016, 
 Dr Miracle, saison 1971, 2017, 
 L'empereur, 2017, 
 Affaire classée: La première affaire du FBI à l'européenne, 2017, 
 Arrêtez de développer des applications, 2018, 
 Technologies : perception, illusion, déception, 2018, 
 Le facteur chance: qu'arriverait-il si un inconnu se mettait à tout gagner ?, 2020, FUSAC : quand la finance se mêle d'informatique, 2020, Vers l'informatique raisonnée: Le concept que vous attendiez !, 2020, (ISBN 979-8674292883)Du client-serveur au Web: 10 ans d'évolutions critiques des techniques informatiques, 2020, (ISBN 979-8695198997)Le fait technique: L’évolution technique est mal connue et mal comprise'', 2021, (ISBN 979-8453307302)

External links
 Official Website

References 

Living people
1960 births